Jallerange is a commune in the Doubs department in the Bourgogne-Franche-Comté region in eastern France.

Geography

History
An imposing Roman villa was discovered in 1771 by Claude Seguin, Seigneur de Jallerange. He created a magnificent garden designed by André Le Nôtre, which has been maintained in the same style for over 200 years.

Population

The inhabitants of the commune are called Joutereys.

See also
 Communes of the Doubs department

References

External links

 Jallerange on the intercommunal Web site of the department 

Communes of Doubs